Fencing at the 2019 African Games was held from 26 to 30 August 2019 in Salé, Morocco.

The event served as a qualifier for the 2020 Summer Olympics in Tokyo, Japan.

Participating nations

Medal table

Medal summary

Men

Women

References

External links
Results
Results book

2019 African Games
African Games
2019 African Games
2019